= Jennifer Saesue =

Jennifer Saesue is a Thai American restauranteur based in New York City. Saesue, along with Chat Suansilphong, are the co-founders of 55 Hospitality, which owns Fish Cheeks, Bangkok Supper Club, and Bub's Bakery.

== Early life and education ==
Saesue was born in New Jersey to parents from Northern Thailand. At age 2, she moved to Thailand, and move to New York City at age 12.

== Career ==
Saesue opened Fish Cheeks, a seafood focused Thai restaurant, in 2016. In 2025, Fish Cheeks opened a second location in Brooklyn.

In 2023, Saesue opened Bangkok Supper Club, a Thai fine dining restaurant.

In September 2025, Saesue opened Bub's Bakery, an allergen-free bakery in Manhattan.
